Senthamarai may refer to:
 Senthamarai (actor), an Indian actor
 Senthamarai (film), a 1962 Indian film
 N. K. Senthamarai Kannan, an Indian police commissioner
 Thamilar Senthamarai, a weekly newspaper